Westport Airport  is a city-owned, public-use airport located one nautical mile (2 km) north of the central business district of Westport, a city in Grays Harbor County, Washington, United States.

Facilities and aircraft 
Westport Airport covers an area of 30 acres (12 ha) at an elevation of 14 feet (4 m) above mean sea level. It has one runway designated 12/30 with an asphalt surface measuring 2,318 by 50 feet (707 x 15 m).

For the 12-month period ending May 31, 2011, the airport had 11,400 aircraft operations, an average of 31 per day: 87% general aviation and 13% air taxi. At that time there were three aircraft based at this airport, all single-engine.

References

External links 
 Westport Airport (14S) at WSDOT Airport Directory
 Aerial image as of June 1990 from USGS The National Map

Airports in Washington (state)
Transportation buildings and structures in Grays Harbor County, Washington